Chhit is a village in Batala, Gurdaspur district, Punjab State, India. The village is administrated by a Sarpanch, an elected representative of the village.

Demography 
, The village has a total number of 196 houses, and a population of 1,080, of which 552 are males and 528 are females, according to the report published by Census India in 2011. The literacy rate of the village is 69.75%, lower than the state average of 75.84%. The population of children under the age of 6 years is 108, which is 10% of total population of the village, and the child sex ratio is approximately 662 lower than the state average of 846.

See also
List of villages in India

References 

Villages in Gurdaspur district